Bart Biemans (born 14 March 1988) is a Belgian professional footballer who plays as a centre back for FC Wezel Sport.

Career 
Playing for K.VV. Hamontlo (2923), K.F.C. Lommel S.K. (1986) and FC Eindhoven in his youth years, Biemans joined Willem II in 2005. Biemans played for several Willem II youth squads and became captain of the Willem II Reserve squad in 2008. Because of many injuries with defensive players like Danny Schenkel, Rens van Eijden and Angelo Martha, he made his debut in the lost away-match against AZ.

After a three-year at Willem II, he signed to a two-year plus an option year contract with Roda JC on 22 June 2011. Though his had contract expired in 2014, and he had actually left the club after it, Biemans signed a new two-year deal in August 2014.

References

External links
 

1988 births
People from Neerpelt
Living people
Belgian footballers
Belgium under-21 international footballers
Association football defenders
Belgium youth international footballers
K.F.C. Lommel S.K. players
Willem II (football club) players
Roda JC Kerkrade players
FC Den Bosch players
FC Eindhoven players
Eredivisie players
Eerste Divisie players
Belgian expatriate footballers
Expatriate footballers in the Netherlands
Belgian expatriate sportspeople in the Netherlands
Footballers from Limburg (Belgium)